The 1880 United States presidential election in Maine took place on November 2, 1880, as part of the 1880 United States presidential election. Voters chose seven representatives, or electors to the Electoral College, who voted for president and vice president.

Maine voted for the Republican nominee, James A. Garfield, over the Democratic nominee, Winfield Scott Hancock. Garfield won the state by a narrow margin of 6.14%. Hancock's relatively strong showing was due to his firm stance against immigration, toward which Garfield was relatively favorable, but which was a major issue for Maine voters who feared immigration would depress their wages. He proved the only Democrat to carry any of Maine's counties between 1856 and 1896 inclusive, and was the last to carry Aroostook County until Lyndon B. Johnson in 1964, and the last to carry Lincoln County and Waldo County until Woodrow Wilson in 1912.

Results

Results by county

See also
 United States presidential elections in Maine

References

Maine
1880
1880 Maine elections